Najran Regional Airport  is an airport in Najran (also spelt as Nejran), Saudi Arabia. It was opened by Mishaal bin Abdullah, governor of the Najran province, on 20 September 2011.

Airlines and destinations

Statistics

See also 

 List of airports in Saudi Arabia
 Najran
 Qaryat al-Faw

References

2011 establishments in Saudi Arabia
Airports established in 2011
Najran
Airports in Saudi Arabia